Greatness Code is short-form sports documentary television series directed by Gotham Chopra, highlighting untold stories about defining moments in professional athletes' careers. The series premiered on July 10, 2020 on Apple TV+, with season 2 premiered on May 13, 2022.

Episodes

Season 1 (2020)

Season 2 (2022)

Release 
On May 20, 2020, Apple announced Greatness Code, co-produced by Religion of Sports and Uninterrupted, with Gotham Chopra directing. The seven-episode series was released on July 10, 2020. Season 2 premiered on May 13, 2022.

References

External links 
 

2020s American documentary television series
2020 American television series debuts
Apple TV+ original programming
Documentary television series about sports
English-language television shows